The London Lions are an English women's basketball team based in Barking, London that compete in the WBBL, the top league of British women's basketball.

History
The team became part of the London Lions in 2017, when the WBBL team Barking Abbey Crusaders and men's professional team London Lions formed a partnership. The Lions won their first piece of silverware, the 2020-21 WBBL Trophy, defeating Nottingham Wildcats 96-64 in the final in Worcester.

Home Venue
Barking Abbey School (2008–present)
Copper Box (2017–present)

Season-by-season records

Players

Current roster

Honours
WBBL Championship
Winners (1): 2021–2022
WBBL Playoffs
Winners (2): 2020–2021, 2021–22
WBBL Trophy
Winners (2): 2020–2021, 2021–2022
WBBL Cup
Winners (2): 2021–2022, 2022–23

References

See Also
Barking Abbey Basketball Academy
London Lions (men)

Women's basketball teams in England
Basketball teams in London
Women's British Basketball League teams
Women's sports teams in London
Sport in the London Borough of Barking and Dagenham
Barking, London
2008 establishments in England
Basketball teams established in 2008